The Edit is a Canadian short film, directed by Michael Todd and released in 1985. The film centres on a television journalist who violates journalistic ethics by altering his story in the editing suite.

The cast includes Michael Magee, Paul de Silva, Richard Wells and Vincent Murray.

The film won the Genie Award for Best Live Action Short Drama at the 7th Genie Awards.

References

External links
 

1985 films
1985 drama films
1985 short films
Best Live Action Short Drama Genie and Canadian Screen Award winners
1980s English-language films
Canadian drama short films
1980s Canadian films